Eddie Gray (February 4, 1920 – October 25, 1969) was a race car driver from Gardena, California. He became champion of a predecessor of the NASCAR Winston West Series in 1958, 1961 and 1962.  The series was then known as NASCAR Pacific Coast Late Model (PCLM).

Gray also participated in NASCAR Grand National races on the West Coast, capturing 4 wins, including two as an owner-driver. On May 31, 1958, Gray won a 500-mile race at Riverside International Raceway, the first NASCAR event held at the track. He also ran the 1958 Southern 500 at Darlington and attempted to make the 1960 Daytona 500.

Gray raced Jalopies with the California Jalopy Association (CJA) and became one of the top short track Stock Car racers in Southern California at tracks like Saugus Speedway (where he was a track champion), Ascot Park and Orange Show Speedway, earning the nickname "Steady" Eddie Gray.

Death
Suffered a severe heart attack while driving in the Permatex 100 race for Late Model Sportsman cars at Riverside International Raceway in January 1969 and died nine months later while undergoing heart surgery.  He is buried at Rose Hills Memorial Park in Whittier, California.

Awards
Gray was inducted in the West Coast Stock Car Hall of Fame in its first class (2002).

References

External links
 

1920 births
1969 deaths
Burials in California
NASCAR drivers
People from Gardena, California
Racing drivers from California
Racing drivers from Los Angeles
Sportspeople from Los Angeles County, California
Place of death missing
Commercial aviators